Vladimir Ivanovich Polonsky (17 June 1893 – 30 October 1937) was a Soviet politician and the 5th First Secretary of Azerbaijan Communist Party.

Early life
Polonsky was born to a Jewish family in Tobolsk, Russia. Since 1907, he was a member of the Bolshevik faction of the Russian Social Democratic Labour Party (RSDLP). Starting from 1908, Polonsky has been a sailor and worked blue collar jobs in Saint Petersburg.

Political career
In 1913, he became a member of union administration.  He was jailed for his political activities in 1914. In 1918–1920, he was a division commissar on Western and Southern fronts and the chairman for the southern region of Trade unions in the Soviet Union. 
In 1930–1933, Polonsky was the First Secretary of the Azerbaijan Communist Party and the Secretary of Transcaucasian Committee of CP of Soviet Union. 

He was arrested on 22 June 1937. Claims that he was tortured are not accompanied by evidence. He was sentenced to death by the Military Tribunal of USSR and executed by firing squad on 30 October 1937 in Lubyanka prison.

Awards
Polonsky was awarded the Order of the Red Banner of Labour.

References

1893 births
1937 deaths
People from Tobolsk
People from Tobolsky Uyezd
Great Purge victims from Azerbaijan
Jews executed by the Soviet Union
Jewish socialists
Russian Jews
Soviet Jews
First secretaries of the Azerbaijan Communist Party
Central Executive Committee of the Soviet Union members
Central Committee of the Communist Party of the Soviet Union candidate members
Executed Russian people
Recipients of the Order of the Red Banner of Labour
Members of the Communist Party of the Soviet Union executed by the Soviet Union